Eamonn Seán Duggan (2 March 1878 – 6 June 1936) was an Irish lawyer and politician who served as Government Chief Whip and Parliamentary Secretary to the Minister for Defence from 1927 to 1932, Parliamentary Secretary to the Minister for Finance from 1926 to 1927, Parliamentary Secretary to the Executive Council from 1922 to 1926, Minister without portfolio September 1922 to December 1922 and Minister for Home Affairs January 1922 to September 1922. He served as a Teachta Dála (TD) from 1918 to 1933. He was a Senator from 1933 to 1936.

Early life
Edmund John Duggan was born in Richhill, County Armagh, in 1878, the son of William Duggan, a Royal Irish Constabulary officer, and Margaret Dunne. His parents had met when his father, a native of County Wicklow, was stationed in Longwood, County Meath, where they married on 19 October 1874. The following year, William was transferred to County Armagh as officers could not serve in their wife's native county.

In 1911, Duggan was living with his parents on St. Brigid's Road Upper in Drumcondra, Dublin. His siblings, William, Margaret and James, were also living there. There were six children born but only four survived by 1911.

After his school education, Duggan began work as a law clerk. During his early years, he became heavily involved in politics after he qualified as a solicitor and set up a practice at 66 Dame Street in Dublin. Duggan was married to Evelyn Kavanagh and together they had one son.

As a keen supporter of Irish independence, Duggan fought in the 1916 Easter Rising; however, following its failure he was subject to court-martial, and was sentenced to three years' penal servitude. Under the general amnesty of 1917, he was released after 14 months in prison, and returned to Dublin where he went back to studying law. For a period, Duggan also served as Irish Republican Army (IRA) Director of Intelligence. 

Duggan was a cousin of revolutionaries Thomas Burke and Christopher Burke through his mother Margaret Dunne.

1916 Easter Rising
In 1916, Duggan was part of Commandant Daly and therefore was serving in the North Dublin Union in the days approaching the 1916 Rising and afterwards Father Matthew Hall. One of Duggan's close friends Thomas Allen was shot while Duggan was at the Four Courts. Duggans efforts to get medical assistance were unsuccessful at Richmond hospital as the British officer who responded to the call declined the message and didn't allow it to go through. Eventually medical assistance was received but it was too late for Allen. In Duggan's region, the volunteers suffered very few injuries with the most violent fighting taking place on Friday night and Saturday morning.

Duggan suffered the consequences and was then sentenced to penal servitude which lasted three years. He was interned in Maidstone, Portland and Lewes prisons. Éamon de Valera and Duggan's attempts at Lewes to fight the authorities and collapse the prison system proved to be victorious as in June 1917, they were both released and Duggan finally got to go back to Dublin and followed his previous roots in law and continued his career as a solicitor.

After 1916
When Duggan was released in 1917, he continued his career in law. Duggan was elected to the First Dáil Éireann as a Sinn Féin TD for Meath South following the 1918 general election. The Drogheda Independent reported "Never before was a successful candidate accorded such a princely reception".

Duggan engaged in the War of Independence and his role in this was the IRA's Director of Intelligence, this came to an end in November 1920 when he was imprisoned again, and was not released until the Anglo-Irish Truce of July 1921. When the truce concluded, Duggan was authorised as one out of the five envoys to discuss and finalise the treaty with the British Prime Minister David Lloyd George. He signed the Anglo-Irish Treaty at 22 Hans Place, London.

Duggan retained numerous ministerial posts in the Cumann na nGaedheal government. In 1921, Duggan played a role in the Irish delegation throughout the Anglo-Irish discussions, he then played a dominant role in liaising with British officials.

Involvement in politics
After the post treaty government, Duggan was appointed the Minister for Home Affairs and shortly afterwards he became the Parliamentary Secretary for the Executive Council and for the Minister for Defence. Duggan continued in various roles as a TD until 1933. These included Government Chief Whip from 1927 to 1932.
Until 1933, Duggan was a Cumann na nGaedheal TD for Meath. In 1933, Duggan declined to go forward for the general election but was elected to Seanad in April 1933. He also was involved in local politics in Dún Laoghaire as the chairman of the Borough Council until he died in 1936.

Duggan's papers
Duggan wrote papers which reflected on his engagement in the Easter Rising. In his letters Duggan wrote about the tough times he spent imprisoned in Lewes, Mountjoy and Portland. Duggan also wrote about his participation in Sinn Féin and how he was released in 1917, and in 1918, how he was triumphant in being a candidate for the South Meath constituency. Most of Duggan's papers consisted of letters to his fiancée and later wife, May Duggan, which he wrote while he was in prison. Duggan's papers were very personal as they consisted of photographs of him, his family members and his political associates etc. Also information of his time as a TD was included. In one of his letters, which Duggan wrote on 25 April 1916, he referenced 'the whole damn family' consisting of information as to  how his volunteers and he were being 'treated as princes' by the nuns in the convent nearby, receiving help from the children in the area and building barricades. In his letter, Duggan also writes about morale amongst his comrades and hearing rumours about a German who had landed in County Kerry. News had emerged of Sean Connolly's death and that the British Army were unfair in concluding the rebellion. In Duggan's note, he proclaims that the letter should be sent to May Duggan who was his fiancée at the time. At the end of the letter Duggan referred to himself as 'Edmund' which he is also known as.

Death
Duggan died suddenly at his home in Dún Laoghaire, Dublin, on 6 June 1936, aged 58, and was buried in Glasnevin Cemetery on the north side of Dublin.

References

External links
 
 

1878 births
1936 deaths
Early Sinn Féin TDs
Cumann na nGaedheal TDs
Cumann na nGaedheal senators
Fine Gael senators
Government Chief Whip (Ireland)
Irish Republican Army (1919–1922) members
Members of the 1st Dáil
Members of the 2nd Dáil
Members of the 3rd Dáil
Members of the 4th Dáil
Members of the 5th Dáil
Members of the 6th Dáil
Members of the 1931 Seanad
Members of the 7th Dáil
Members of the 1934 Seanad
Members of the Parliament of the United Kingdom for County Meath constituencies (1801–1922)
Ministers for Justice (Ireland)
Politicians from County Armagh
Parliamentary Secretaries of the 6th Dáil
Parliamentary Secretaries of the 5th Dáil
Parliamentary Secretaries of the 4th Dáil
Parliamentary Secretaries of the 3rd Dáil
People of the Irish Civil War (Pro-Treaty side)
UK MPs 1918–1922